Coggle is a freeware mind mapping web application. Coggle produces hierarchically structured documents, like a branching tree. This contrasts with other collaborative editors, like Google Docs, which provide either linear (text document), or tabular (spreadsheet) document formats.

Its authors promise that it will be "free forever" although some features require a paid subscription.

Features 
Some of Coggle's notable features:
 Real-time collaboration
 Sharing with organisations, individuals, or by private link
 View and copy previous versions
 Images
 Links
 Multiple root items
 Joining branches
 Comments on items
 Markdown text formatting
 LaTeX math support using MathJax
 iOS support
 Android support

Supported file formats 
Coggle supports export to PNG image and vector PDF formats, and import from plain-text outlines. There is also support for importing or exporting to the common FreeMind file format.

Reception 
Coggle was voted among the top-5 mind-mapping applications by the readers of Lifehacker in April 2013, three months after the website was first registered.

Coggle has had a strong reception among the education community, praised for its simplicity and ease of use compared to other mind-mapping software.

PC World has criticized the visually simple user-interface for hiding too many elements, making advanced feature discovery difficult.

References

External links 

Mind-mapping software
Note-taking software